The Krasin is a Russian (formerly Soviet) icebreaker. The vessel operates in polar regions.

History
The ship was built at the Wärtsilä Helsinki Shipyard in Helsinki, Finland in 1976. Named after an early Bolshevik leader and Soviet diplomat Leonid Krasin and an earlier icebreaker of the same name.

Design
The second Krasin is a triple-screw diesel-powered icebreaker owned by the Far East Shipping Company (FESCO) and is based in Vladivostok. The hull has a friction-reducing coating.

Service
The Krasin departed Vladivostok on December 21, 2004 and arrived at the Ross Sea ice edge one month later.

The Krasin departed the Ross Sea on the 9th of February, reaching  Vladivostok on March 5, 2005. She is unlikely to return to the Antarctic as FESCO have signed a multi-year contract for Krasin to support oil rig operations in the Sea of Okhotsk from March 2005 onwards. Along with her sister ship Admiral Makarov, Krasin has been providing winter escort to large capacity tankers from the port of De-Kastri (Khabarovsk) as part of the Sakhalin-I project. During the summer months she provides escort on the Northern Sea Route to the Eastern sector of Arctic servicing sea terminals of North Chukotka.

In September 2022, it was announced that Krasins 1974-built sister ship Ermak would be dismantled for parts to keep the 1976-built icebreaker in service.

See also
She is one of four large icebreakers operated by the Far East Shipping Company:
Admiral Makarov
Magadan
Kapitan Khlebnikov

References

External links

Account of Krasin's expedition to McMurdo Sound.

Ships built in Helsinki
Icebreakers of the Soviet Union
Icebreakers of Russia
1976 ships